Bulungʻur is a city in Samarqand Region, Uzbekistan. It is the capital of Bulungʻur District. The town's population was 21,030 people in 1989, and 29,200 in 2016.

References

Populated places in Samarqand Region
Cities in Uzbekistan